Lysogorskaya is a rural locality (a stanitsa) in Georgiyevsky District of Stavropol Krai, Russia. Population:

References

Rural localities in Stavropol Krai